The Yiwan Railway Wanzhou Yangtze River Bridge is an arch bridge in Wanzhou District, Chongqing, China. The bridge was completed in 2005 and carries the Yichang−Wanzhou Railway across the Yangtze River. The bridge spans  making it one of the longest arch bridges in the world.

See also
 List of longest arch bridge spans
 Yangtze River bridges and tunnels

References

External links

 http://trid.trb.org/view.aspx?id=1125907

Bridges in Chongqing
Arch bridges in China
Bridges completed in 2005
Bridges over the Yangtze River